La Almudena is a station on Line 2 of the Madrid Metro. It is located in fare Zone A.

References 

Line 2 (Madrid Metro) stations
Railway stations in Spain opened in 2011
Buildings and structures in Ciudad Lineal District, Madrid